Samsung Global Scholarship Program (Samsung GSP or GSP) is a talent program of Samsung Electronics (SEC). Focusing on the goal of having talented personnel with strong business skills, leadership potential and career aspirations, SEC recognized the compelling need for high-quality leaders, hence the Global Scholarship Program was created to nurture a very selectively compiled group of individuals, who later in the long run might become leaders ("Future Global Leaders") of the various SEC subsidiaries around the world, replacing the Korean-national management layer (what is the usual practice at the chaebol). It differs from Samsung Scholarship, formerly known as Samsung Lee Kun-hee Scholarship for supporting exceptionally talented Korean university students for global educations in mostly STEM (science, technology, engineering, and mathematics) fields.

Divided into two paths, both programs originally selected participants who demonstrate academic excellence and leadership potential and provides them with unique opportunities for further professional development. Starting from 2011, GSP-SKK instead contains employees working in the subsidiaries. The program also provides young leaders with a unique international network through which they can share ideas, learn from established leaders, work collaboratively and address global challenges. By exposing participants to the complex issues and opportunities arising from an increasingly interdependent global economy, the program aims to expand perspectives and enhance skills critical for leadership in a changing world.

Scholarship program

Each year 15-25 individuals from different parts of the globe are offered to take part in the program that has two distinctive paths: an engineer and an MBA track:
 GSP (M.S. Program) through Seoul National University (SNU)
 GSP (M.B.A. Program) through SungKyunKwan University's Graduate School of Business (SKK GSB) [in collaboration with MIT Sloan]

The (Global) MBA program is notable for its diversity and pioneer nature. It was built and now run together with MIT Sloan since its foundation, and it was the first global English-only MBA program in Korea. Selected GSP students currently study for three semesters. It used to be four semesters, including a possibility of spending a semester at one of SKK GSB's top partner universities in the U.S. (MIT Sloan, Columbia, Northwestern's Kellogg, Michigan's Ross, Dartmouth's Tuck or Indiana's Kelly). SKK GSB Global MBA has been recently ranked by the Financial Times as the #1 MBA in Korea, Top 10 in Asia and 45th worldwide.

The significance of the program can also be seen from the wide range of students who, as it was already in the first years, came from the leading companies including Cheil Communications, Amore Pacific, Woori Bank, POSCO, SK, Kyobo, Everland, Bosch, KTF and several Samsung subsidiaries.

After graduation, participants are offered various responsibilities at Samsung Electronics and although some elected to follow a different career path (at management consultancies, for instance) many participants stayed with SEC.

Participants

Samsung Engineering Program

Selected in 2004
 Abhinav Arora (India)
 Alexey Sidelnikov (Russia)
 Feng Xingguang (China)
 Pankaj Agarwal (India)
 Sergey Seleznev (Russia)
 Veronika Kondratieva (Russia)
 Vidyesh Kumar Jha (India)
 Shiva Ram Krishna (India)
 Huang Ren (China)
 Liu Wei (China)
 Zhang Xiaojie (China)
 Bao Xiaoyan (China)
 Li Zhenmin (China)

Selected in 2005
 Hai Liu (China)
 Ji Limin (China)
 Liao Lingling (China)
 Maria Samokhina (Russia)
 Andrey Serov (Russia)

Selected in 2006
 Venkata Krishna Prasad Arava (India)
 Lochan Verma(India)
 Guo Chunxu (China)
 Liu Jiakun(China)
 Kirill Moklyuk (Russia)
 Chetan Raj] (India)
 Singhal Nitin (India)
 Alexey Sokolov (Russia)
 Stanislav Belogolov (Russia)
 Yu Wang (China)
 Xiaolin Xi (China)
 Feng Zhu (China)

Selected in 2007
 Kiran Tharanath (India)
 Abhishek Joshi (India)
 Manish Kumar (India)
 Sumit Srivastav (India)
 Arseny  Vitaljevich Povolotsky (Russia)
 Artem Shamsuarov (Russia)
 Sergey Georgievich Menabde (Russia)
 Mao Shunfu (China)
 Miao Hui (China)
 Liu Yu (China)
 Zhang Hairong (China)
 Ji Yang (China)

Selected in 2008
 Subhojit Chakladar (India)
 Ivan Koryakovskiy (Russia)
 Alexey Bodrov (Russia)
 Dmitry Vengertsev (Russia)
 Nikolay Kuznetsov (Russia)
 Stepan Tulikov (Russia)
 Xing Nan (China)

Selected in 2009
 Rahul Singh (India)
 Nalin Chakoo (India)
 Liu Jin (China)
 Alexei Boev (Russia)
 Nikolay Burlutsky (Russia)
 Nikita Kozhukhov(Russia)

Selected in 2010
 Elena Emelianova (Russia)
 Valeriya Guseva (Russia)
 Alexander Schus (Russia)
 Ildefonso De La Cruz (Spain)
 Thomas Morris (United States)
 Farah Al-Naimi (UK)
 Zhu Mingyoung (China)

Selected in 2012
 Husam Fahmi (Iraq)
 Maria Bortnichenko (Russia)
 Evgeny Kornev (Russia)
 Sergey Lyubich (Russia)
 Felix Penningsfeld (Germany)
 Rajeev Ranjan (India)
 Tushar Sandhan (India)
 Sukanya Sonowal (India)

Selected in 2013
 Kamil Adamczewski (Poland)
 Mattheus Miranda (Brazil)
 Anish Tamse (India)

Selected in 2014
 Pankaj Thorat (India)

Samsung & Korea University Graduate School of International Studies Program

Selected in 2002
 Ma Saiyou (China)
 Liu Song (China)
 Kunal Agrawal (India)
 Supriya Chatterji (India)
 James Ryan Jonas (Philippines)
 Dorota Jachimek (Poland)
 Anna Sawińska (Poland)
 Krittawit Krittayaruangroj (Thailand)
 Suchitra Wanatanakul (Thailand)

Selected in 2003
 Jing Jing (China)
 Piyush Kunnapallil (India)
 Karen Khristine Natividad (Philippines)
 Jakub Dubaniewicz (Poland)
 Anna Wasiela (Poland)
 Michelle Yip (Singapore)
 Tri Tung Nguyen (Vietnam)

Samsung MBA Program

Selected in 2004
 Dominika Dor (Poland)
 Ilya Fedotov (Russia)
 Olga Gordeeva (Russia)
 Akshay Gupta (India)
 Li Meng (China)
 Pawel Rokicki (Poland)
 Tamás Szekeres (Hungary)
 Narumol Pichedpun (Thailand)
 Xu Tao (China)
 Zhang Xiao (China)
 Chen Yanyan (China)
 Stephanie Wong Tzu En (Singapore)

Selected in 2005
 Aalisha Chand (India)
 Nguyen Thuan Dat (Vietnam)
 Oksana Gladushyna (Ukraine)
 Mishakova Olena (Ukraine)
 Péter Hanti (Hungary)
 Ding Jie (China)
 Lu Jing (China)
 Peter Komornik (Slovakia)
 Ambrus Kovács (Hungary)
 Saurav Singla (India)
 Trinh Khac Toan (Vietnam)
 Poramet Visetruangrote (Thailand)
 Zhang Xu (China)
 Liu Xuan (China)
 Song Yaning (China)
 Igor Kurilin (Russia)

Selected in 2006
 Nikita Andriyashin (Russia)
 László Bánhegyi (Hungary)
 Feng Jin (China)
 Renju John (India)
 Dénes Korsós (Hungary)
 Jenny Luna (Philippines)
 Mihaela Marinitu (Romania)
 Nguyễn Minh Thư Nhiên (Vietnam)
 Kvetoslava Polcová (Slovakia)
 Gustaf Rössner (Sweden)
 Çınar Şahin (Turkey)
 Petr Shchekochikhin (Russia)
 Vadim Sukhovey (Russia)
 Nussaraporn Sumretphol (Thailand)

Selected in 2007 
 Abu Nasar Siddiq Alvi (Pakistan)
 Georgi Boykov Bonev (Bulgaria)
 Alexandru Costache (Romania)
 Rachel Dwiayutia (Indonesia)
 Peera Kasemtanakul (Thailand)
 Nguyen Le Khoi (Vietnam)
 Marina Lyubimova (Russia)
 Deepak Sachan (India)
 Venkata Aditya Sankarabhotla (India)
 Jayant Sidharth (India)
 Alexandra Sipos (Hungary)
 Ban Thuy Kieu Trang (Vietnam)
 Fei Yu (China)
 Nguyen Le Khanh Vy (Vietnam)

Selected in 2008
 Yukti Garg (India)
 Varun Swaminathan (India)
 Famuyiwa Opeoluwa (Nigeria)
 Phan Thi Kim Duyen (Vietnam)
 Nguyen Thi Thu Ha (Vietnam)
 Alexandra Podrumaru(Romania)
 Viktors Ivanovs (Latvia)
 Amir Gorgan (Canada)
 Mehdi (Cyrus) Tabatabaei (Iran)
 Adeline Quek (Singapore)
 Suzanne Otieno (Kenya)
 Xijie Li (China)
 Quan Sun (China)
 Olga Alexandrovna Egorova (Russia)
 Seif El-Din El-Hakim (Egypt)
 Kalamkas Mambeteyeva (Kazakhstan)

Selected in 2009
 Ritesh Chugani (India)
 Amr Mostafa (Egypt)
 Gustavo Nakano Athayde Franca (Brazil)
 Silvia Manami Kawamura (Brazil)
 Samuel Odhiambo (Kenya)
 Joaquin Melendez Sanchez (Colombia)
 Luciana D'Abramo (Argentina)
 Ezenwanne Chima (Nigeria)
 Wang Rui (China)
 Alper Gul (Turkey)

Selected in 2010
 Pedro Costa (Brazil)
 Victor Valdes(Chile)
 Ayoub Derdabi (Morocco)
 Eleonore Fontaine (France)
 Daniel Tuckman (United States)
 Divesh Sooka (South Africa)
 Marina Voskoboynikova (Russia)
 Osama Elobeid (Sudan)
 Jiayue Tao (China)

Selected in 2011
 Usman Tariq (Pakistan)
 Nuruddin Abdulla Khatri (India)
 Jerry Halim (Indonesia)
 Pham Phuong Linh (Vietnam)
 Li Xiang(China)
 Mee Soo Kim (Chile)
 Akshay Gupta (India)

Selected in 2012
 Jenny Shull (United States)
 Robert Hodges(UK)
 Roberto Jimenez(Spain)
 Nguyen Van Quynh (Vietnam)
 Viet Thanh Pham (Vietnam)
 Sandeep Gupta(India)
 Pankaj Narayan (India)
 Andriy Baranovskyy (Ukraine)

External links
 Samsung Electronics (in English)
 Samsung GSP: Russia, India UK
 Seoul National University (SNU) (in English)
 SNU Department of Electrical Engineering (in English)
 SungKyunKwan University (SKKU) (in English)
 SKK Graduate School of Business

References
 대학 교직원 인재영입 `붐` (Competition among universities to secure talents)
 성균관대‥영어로 수업ㆍ美MIT 슬로언 등과 연계 (SKK GSB in collaboration with MIT Sloan)
 성균관대, 삼성재단 영입 10주년 (The alliance between SKKU and Samsung)
 국내에서 만나는 국제수준의 MBA (SKK GSB - world class MBA program in Korea)
 성균관대 MIT MBA 첫 외국인 졸업생 (International students in the 1st SKK GSB alumni)
 SKK GSB as a best example of Samsung's management philosophy
 Samsung supports Seoul school
 성대·MIT, MBA 과정 출범
 월리엄 파운즈 MIT 前학장 "외국 MBA 베껴서는 절대 성공못해"
 성균관대 경영대학원 ‥ MIT대 커리큘럼 이용
 KBS News: 토착 MBA 시대
 Samsung Educational Programs on the Moscow State University site

Samsung Electronics
Scholarships in South Korea